Smokey & Friends is a studio album by musician Smokey Robinson. It was released in August 2014 under Verve Records.  Reaching #12 on Billboards album chart, it stands as Smokey's second most successful solo album.

Track listing

Charts

Weekly charts

Year-end charts

References

2014 albums
Smokey Robinson albums
Verve Records albums